(regionally also ) is a 15 m high basalt stack along the eastern shore of the Vatnsnes peninsula, in northwest Iceland.

The rock has two holes at the base, which give it the appearance of a dragon who is drinking. The base of the stack has been reinforced with concrete to protect its foundations from the sea.

Several species of birds, such as gulls and fulmars, live at Hvítserkur and its name ("white shirt" in Icelandic) comes from the color of the guano deposited on its rocks.

References

North Iceland
Stacks of Iceland
Volcanic plugs of Iceland